Rev. Lovick Pierce (March 24, 1785–November 9, 1879) was an American Pastor, Chaplain, and author. He was nicknamed the “Father of the Methodist Church in west Georgia”, and was the father of George Foster Pierce. Pierce was instrumental in Wesleyan College’s founding and served on the first Board of Trustees.

Biography 
Lovick Pierce was born on March 24, 1785 in Halifax County, North Carolina. He was a Methodist Chaplain for the United States Army in the War of 1812. 

In 1836, Lovick joined St. Luke United Methodist Church in Columbus, Georgia. Around 1866, Pierce helped organize what became the First African Methodist Episcopal Church in Athens, Georgia, originally named Pierce's Chapel. Not to be confused with Pierce Chapel on the Wesleyan College campus, named after his son. A prolific author, Rev. Pierce was an early Southern proponent of the Holiness movement. 

He died in Sparta, Georgia on November 9, 1879.

References

1785 births
1879 deaths
American people of the War of 1812
American military chaplains
American clergy
Holiness movement
War of 1812 chaplains